King John's Castle may refer to:
King John's Castle (Limerick), Limerick City, Ireland
King John's Castle (Carlingford), County Louth, Ireland
King John's Castle (Kilmallock), County Limerick, Ireland
King John's Castle in Kineton, Warwickshire, United Kingdom
King John's Castle, a horse that finished second in the 2008 Grand National

See also
Athenry, County Galway
Naas, County Kildare
Odiham Castle near Odiham, Hampshire
Trim Castle, County Meath